Assault on the State Treasure (Italian: Assalto al tesoro di stato) is a 1967 Italian action film directed by Piero Pierotti and starring Roger Browne, Anita Sanders and Franco Ressel.

Plot
Four criminals plan to rob a twenty million dollar transfer between an Arab central bank and a British oil company.

Cast
 Roger Browne as Johnny Quick 
 Anita Sanders as Shanda Lear 
 Franco Ressel as Elias 
 Sandro Dori as Otto Linnemann 
 Dina De Santis as Helga 
 Tullio Altamura as Lodz 
 Olga Solbelli as Madame Angot 
 Antonietta Fiorito
 Angela De Leo
 Lucio Casoria
 Silvio Laurenzi
 Zuccolo Di Spilimbergo
 Renato Montalbano as Ben Aisham 
 Valentino Macchi as Record Oil Company board member 
 Rosy De Leo
 Lina Franchi as Teresa Simona 
 Gianni Baghino as Ahmed 
 Daniele Vargas as Kaufman 
 John Stacy as President of the Record Oil Company

References

Bibliography 
 Peter Cowie & Derek Elley. World Filmography: 1967. Fairleigh Dickinson University Press, 1977.

External links 
 

1967 films
Italian action films
1960s action films
1960s Italian-language films
Films directed by Piero Pierotti
Films set in London
Films set in the Middle East
1960s Italian films